1280 (MCCLXXX) was a leap year starting on Monday (link will display the full calendar) in the Julian calendar.

Events 
<onlyinclude>
 June 23 – Reconquista – Battle of Moclín: Troops of the Emirate of Granada defeat those of the Kingdom of Castile, and Kingdom of León.
 September 27 – King Magnus III of Sweden founds a Swedish nobility, by enacting a law accepting a contribution of a cavalry-member in lieu of ordinary tax payments.
 Construction on the northern section of the Grand Canal of China is begun.
 The final expansion of Lincoln Cathedral in England is completed.
 Tsar Ivan Asen III of Bulgaria flees from Tarnovo, ending the Asen Dynasty in Bulgaria.
 Syria attempts to secede from the Mamluk Sultanate of Egypt, but Al Mansur Qalawun defeats the rebels, and keeps Syria within the Egyptian sultanate.
 The second of two main surveys of the Hundred Rolls, an English census seen as a follow up to the Domesday Book completed in 1086, is completed; it began in 1279.
 Turin is conquered by Thomas III of Savoy, becoming the capital of the House of Savoy.
 Approximate date
 The Ancestors of the Māori people from eastern Polynesia become the first human settlers of New Zealand.
 The Wolf minimum of solar activity begins.

Births 
 Birger, King of Sweden, Swedish monarch (d. 1321)
 Wu Zhen, Chinese painter (d. 1354)
 Approximate date
 Anna of Kashin, Russian saint (d. 1368)
 Musa I of Mali, West African emperor (d. c.1337)

Deaths 
 February 10 – Margaret II, Countess of Flanders (b. 1202)
 May 9 – Magnus VI of Norway
 August 22 – Pope Nicholas III (b. 1218)
 November 15 – Albertus Magnus, German theologian
 January 1 – Ertuğrul father of Osman I

References